Cecilia Manguerra Brainard is an author and editor of 20 books. She co-founded PAWWA or Philippine American Women Writers and Artists; and also founded Philippine American Literary House. Brainard's works include the World War II novel, When the Rainbow Goddess Wept, The Newspaper Widow, Magdalena, and Woman With Horns and Other Stories. She edited several anthologies including Fiction by Filipinos in America, Contemporary Fiction by Filipinos in America, and two volumes of Growing Up Filipino I and II, books used by educators.

Biography
Cecilia Manguerra Brainard (born 1947) grew up in  Cebu City, Philippines, the youngest of four children to Concepcion Cuenco Manguerra and Mariano F. Manguerra. The death of her father when she was nine prompted her to start writing, first in journals, then essays and fiction. She attended St. Theresa's College and Maryknoll College in the Philippines; and she did graduate work at UCLA.

Brainard has worked with Asian American youths for which she received a Special Recognition Award from the Los Angeles Board of Education. She has also received awards from the California State Senate, 21st District, several USIS Grants, a California Arts Council Fellowship, an Outstanding Individual Award from the City of Cebu, Philippines, Brody Arts Fund Award, a City of Los Angeles Cultural grant, and many more. The books she has written and edited have also won awards, the Gintong Aklat Award and the International Gourmand Award among them. Her work has been translated into Finnish and Turkish.

Brainard's second novel, Magdalena inspired the playwright Jocelyn Deona de Leon to write a stage play, Gabriela's Monologue, which was produced in 2011 by the Bindlestiff Studio in San Francisco as part of Stories XII! annual production showcasing original works for the stage by Pilipino/Filipino  American Artists.

Brainard's writings can be found in periodicals such as Town and Country, Zee Lifestyle Magazine, Focus Philippines, Philippine Graphic, Amerasia Journal, Bamboo Ridge among others.  Her stories have been anthologized in books such as Making Waves (1989), Songs of Ourselves (1994),  On a Bed of Rice (1995), "Pinay: Autobiographical Narratives by Women Writers, 1926-1998" (Ateneo 2000), "Asian American Literature" (Glencoe McGraw-Hill 2001),Cherished (New World Library, 2011),  and others.

Selected works

Novels and short story collections (writer)

Acapulco at Sunset and other Stories (short story collection, Anvil, 1995); (PALH/Philippine American Literary House, 2020)
Angelica's Daughters, a Dugtungan Novel (a collaborative novel co-authored by Brainard, Cuizon, Evangelista, Montes, and Sarreal, Anvil, 2010)
"Gokkusagi Tanricasi Agladginda" (Turkish edition of "When the Rainbow Goddess Wept" Bilge Kultur Sanat, translated by Fusun Talay, 2001)
Magdalena (novel, Plain View Press, 2002); (University of Santo Tomas Publishing House, 2016); (PALH/Philippine American Literary House, 2021)
The Newspaper Widow (novel, University of Santo Tomas Publishing House, 2017); (PALH/Philippine American Literary House, 2021)
Selected Short Stories by Cecilia Manguerra Brainard (short story collection, University of Santo Tomas Publishing House, 2021), (PALH/Philippine American Literary House, 2021).
Vigan and other Stories (short story collection, Anvil, 2011)
When the Rainbow Goddess Wept (novel, Dutton, 1994), which first appeared as Song of Yvonne;  (New Day Publishers, 1991) (Plume paperback, 1995); (University of Michigan Press, 1999); (University of Santo Tomas Publishing House, 2019)
Woman With Horns and Other Stories (short story collection, New Day Publishers, 1988; (PALH/Philippine American Literary House, 2020)

Short story collections (edited)
Ala Carte Food and Fiction (Edited by Brainard and Orosa, Anvil, 2007)
Asian and Philippine Folktales: Retellings by PAWWA, (Edited by Brainard, PALH, 2022)
Contemporary Fiction by Filipinos in America (Anvil, 1998; PALH/Philippine American Literary House, 2021)
Fiction by Filipinos in America (New Day, 1993); (PALH/Philippine American Literary House, 2020)
Growing Up Filipino: Stories for Young Adults (PALH & Anvil, 2003)
Growing Up Filipino II: More Stories for Young Adults (PALH, 2010)
Growing Up Filipino 3: New Stories for Young Adults (University of Santo Tomas Publishing House, 2022; PALH/Philippine American Literary House, 2023)
Seven Stories from Seven Sisters: A Collection of Philippine Folktales (Co-editor, PAWWA, 1992)
The Beginning and Other Asian Folktales (Co-editor, PAWWA, 1995)

Non-fiction collections (edited)
Behind the Walls: Life of Convent Girls (Edited by Brainard and Orosa, Anvil, 2005)
Finding God: True Stories of Spiritual Encounters (Edited by Brainard and Orosa, Anvil, 2009)
Journey of 100 Years: Reflections on the Centennial of Philippine Independence (Edited by Brainard and Litton, Anvil, PAWWA, 1999)
Magnificat: Mama Mary's Pilgrim Sites (Edited by Brainard, Anvil, 2012)
Philippine Woman in America (New Day Publishers, 1991)

Non-fiction (writer)
Cecilia's Diary: 1962-1969 (memoir, Anvil, 2003)
Fundamentals of Creative Writing (Anvil, 2009)
Magical Years: Memories & Sketches (PALH, 2020)
Out of Cebu: Essays and Personal Prose (personal essays, University of San Carlos Press, 2012)
Philippine Woman in America (New Day Publishers, 1991)

Awards
Top Hat Award from the Philippine American Business Improvement and Development (2015)
Certificate of Recognition from the United States House of Representatives (Juan Vargas) (2015)
Gintong Aklat Award (Golden Book Award), for Finding God: True Stories of Spiritual Encounters (coeditor) (2009)
Gourmand Award, for Ala Carte Food & Fiction (coeditor) (2008)
Certificate of Recognition from the Cebu Provincial Government (2006)
Amazing Alumni Achiever Award from Maryknoll College, QC, RP (2003)
Certificate of Recognition from the California State Senate, 21st District (Jack Scott) (2001)
Filipinas Magazine Achievement Award for Arts and Culture (2001)
California State Summer School for the Arts Award (2000)
Outstanding Individual Award from the City of Cebu, Philippines (1998)
USIS Travel Lecture Grants (1995 & 1997)
Makati Rotarian Award (1994)
Literature Award, Filipino Women's Network (1992)
City of Los Angeles Certificate of Appreciation (1992)
Brody Arts Fund Fellowship (1991)
Special Recognition Award, Los Angeles Board of Education (1991)
City of Los Angeles Cultural Grant (1990–91)
California Arts Council Artists' Fellowship in Fiction (1989–90)

See also

Estrella Alfon
Carlos Bulosan
N.V.M. Gonzalez
Jessica Hagedorn
Tess Uriza Holthe
Lina Espina-Moore
Jose Rizal
Ninotchka Rosca
E. San Juan, Jr.
Bienvenido Santos
Miguel Syjuco
Linda Ty Casper
F.Sionil Jose

References

Other sources
 Abao, Jane Frances P. 2001. "Retelling the Stories, Rewriting the Bildungsroman: Cecilia Manguerra Brainard's  When the Rainbow Goddess Wept ." Humanities Diliman (January–June).
 Adler, Les. 1996. "Acapulco at Sunset and Other Stories: A Review." Pilipinas 26 (Spring).
 Alexice, Mya. Book Review of "The Newspaper Widow" - Foreword Reviews, January/February 2018.
 Anonas-Carpio, Alma. "The Tremendous Power of Secrets." Philippines Graphic. March 2, 2018. 
 Aubry, Erin. "A Child's Vision of Life During Wartime." Los Angeles Times. November 15, 1994, E-8.
 Beltran, Marie G. "Woman With Horns and Other Concerns." Filipinas (May 1995): 29, 56.
 Casper, Leonard. "BACK-AZIMUTH Filipino Writers Abroad." Kinaadman XXVII (2005): 69-82.
 Casper, Leonard. Rev. of Song of Yvonne, Philippine Studies 41 (2nd Quarter 1993): 251-54.
 Cebuano Studies Center & National Commission for Culture and the Arts. The Cebuana in the World: Cecilia Manguerra Brainard Writing Out of Cebu Cebuano Studies Center, documentary video premiered Feb. 7, 2023. 
 Cruz, Isagani R. "The Pleasures of Ubec, Otherwise Known as Cebu." Starweek: The Sunday Magazine of the Philippine Star (October 29, 1995): 20.
 Cruz, Jhoanna Lynn. "Cecilia Manguerra Brainard's Fiction: Bridging Distances". Likha, Vol. 15, No. 1, 1994-1995: 14-22.
 Campomanes, Oscar V. 2012. "Cecilia Manguerra Brainard, Scenographer." Introduction of Cecilia Manguerra Brainard's  Vigan and Other Stories  (2012).
 Diores, Luis. "Cecilia Manguerra-Brainard: Fiction is Organic to me." Kulokabildo: Dialogues with Cebuano Writers Ed. Yu, Hope S. University of San Carlos Cebuano Studies Center, 2009, 125-132.
 Grice, Helen. "Artistic Creativity, Form, and Fictional Experimentation in Filipina American Fiction." MELUS: The Journal of the Society for the Study of the Multi-Ethnic Literature of the United States 29.1 (2004): 181-198.
 Grow, L. M. "Brainard, Cecilia Manguerra (1947-)".The Greenwood Encyclopedia of Asian American Literature. Ed. Guiyou Huang. Westport, Connecticut: Greenwood Press, 2009, 100-104.
 Lauron, Cheryl Grace Palang. "The Adolescent Filipino in Cecilia Manguerra Brainard's Select Short Fictions: Learning Activities." MA Education Thesis, Cebu Technological University, 2015.
 Lim Jr., Paulino (2012), "Diplotic (Double Vision) Consciousness of Overseas Filipino Writers." A Paper delivered at the Ninth International Conference on the Philippines, Oct 28-30, 2012 at Michigan State University, page 5.
 Magan, Rhodora G. "Cecilia Manguerra Brainard's Oriental Oriental "Magdalena": A Linguistic Reinvention." GSTF Journal of Law and Social Sciences (JLSS) Vol. 4, No. 2, 2015.
 Magan, Rhodora G. "Eve and Her Beings: A Chopin-Brainard Simulation." A Paper delivered at the Asian Conference on Literature & Librarianship, April 2–5, 2015 in Osaka, Japan.
 Melnick, Lisa Suguitan. "An Enjoyable Period Piece." Positively Filipino. March 27, 2018.
 Pieri, Caterina E. (2003). "Tesi di Laurea: When the Rainbow Goddess Wept di Cecilia Manguerra Brainard." MA in English, Literary Translation Thesis, Universita di Torino, Italy.
 Rafols, Margarita. 2010. "Hide and Seek: Redefining 'Filipino' in Cecilia Manguerra Brainard's  Fiction by Filipinos in America  (1993) and  Contemporary Fiction by Filipinos in America  (1997)." BA Literature Thesis, Ateneo de Manila University.
 Rimando, Ruth S. (2006). "Foregrounding Myths and Legends in Cecilia Manguerra Brainard's When the Rainbow Goddess Wept." BA. Literature Thesis, University of Santo Tomas.
 Wigley, John Jack (2004). "Representations of the Female Body in Cecilia Manguera Brainard's Fiction." MA Literature Thesis, University of Santo Tomas.
 Wigley, John Jack. "From Waxing to Waning: Woman's Psychosexual Development in Selected Short Stories of Cecilia Manguerra Brainard and Michelle Cruz Skinner." Inter/Sections (February 18, 2008):48-49.
 Ty, Eleanor. "Cecilia Manguerra Brainard. Asian American Novelists: A Bio-Bibliographical Critical Sourcebook. Ed. Emmanuel S. Nelson. Westport, Connecticut: Greenwood Press, 2000, 29-33.
 Ty, Eleanor. "'Never Again Be the Yvonne of Yesterday': Personal and Collective Loss in Cecilia Brainard's Song of Yvonne." In Writing Dispossession, Writing Desire: Asian-American Women Writers. Ed. Srimati Mukherjee.
 Ty, Eleanor. "The Politics of the Visible in Asian North American Narratives", Toronto: University of Toronto Press, .

External links
 Cecilia Brainard by Eleanor Ty, in Asian American Novelists.
  Author's website

1947 births
Living people
Filipino novelists
Filipino women short story writers
Filipino short story writers
Filipino women novelists
Cebuano writers
American novelists of Asian descent
American women novelists
American writers of Filipino descent
English-language writers from the Philippines
Postmodern writers
20th-century American novelists
21st-century American novelists
Writers from California
Filipino emigrants to the United States
People from Cebu City
Writers from Cebu
American women short story writers
20th-century American women writers
21st-century American women writers
20th-century American short story writers
21st-century American short story writers